The Norwegian bandy season starts with the Kosa Open where the winner of the elite section qualifies for the Kopa Cup. Eight teams then contest the Norwegian Bandy Premier League. The league system comprises four leagues, with nineteen different clubs as well as ten B teams.

List of clubs
The list of clubs is updated for the 2012–13 season.

Premier League
Drammen, Drammen
Høvik, Høvik, Bærum
Mjøndalen, Mjøndalen
Ready, Vestre Aker, Oslo
Sarpsborg, Sarpsborg
Solberg, Solbergelva
Stabæk, Stabekk, Bærum
Ullevål, Nordre Aker, Oslo

First Division
Hamar, Hamar
Nordre Sande, Sande i Vestfold
Snarøya, Snarøya, Bærum
Solberg 2, Solbergelva
Stabæk 2, Stabekk, Bærum
Ullern, Ullern, Oslo
Ullevål 2, Nordre Aker, Oslo
Øvrevoll Hosle, Hosle, Bærum

Second Division
Drammen 2, Drammen
Frigg, Frogner, Oslo
Haslum, Haslum, Bærum
Konnerud, Drammen
Ready 2, Vestre Aker, Oslo
Sarpsborg 2, Sarpsborg
Øvrevoll Hosle 2, Hosle, Bærum

Third Division
Bergen, Bergen
Ready 3, Vestre Aker, Oslo
Røa, Vestre Aker, Oslo
Skeid, Nordre Aker, Oslo
Strømsgodset, Drammen
Ullern 2, Ullern, Oslo
NTNUI, Trondheim – pulled team

External links
Norwegian Bandy Association